Sunny Isle is a shopping center at Sion Farm on the island of Saint Croix in the United States Virgin Islands.

References

Buildings and structures in the United States Virgin Islands